= Dadokome =

Town of ancient Bithynia

Coordinates: 40°46′31″N 31°54′03″E

Dadokome was a town of ancient Bithynia, inhabited in Roman times.

Its site is located near Köroğluderbend, Asiatic Turkey.
